A "main road" may refer to:

 A major road in a town or village, or in a country area.
 A highway
 A trunk road, especially in British English

Main Road may refer to:
 Main Road, Hobart, Australia
 Main Road (M)1.10 (Serbia)
 Main Road (M)1.9 (Serbia)
 Main Road (M)1 (Serbia)
 Main Road (St. Marys, Georgia), listed on the NRHP in Camden County, Georgia, U.S.

See also
 Department of Main Roads (disambiguation)
 Main Central Road, Kerala, India
 Main North Road, Adelaide, South Australia
 Main Park Road, Miami-Dade County, Florida, U.S.
 Main South Road, Adelaide, South Australia
 Maine Road, a former football stadium in Moss Side, Manchester, England